Normative generally means relating to an evaluative standard. Normativity is the phenomenon in human societies of designating some actions or outcomes as good, desirable, or permissible, and others as bad, undesirable, or impermissible. A norm in this sense means a standard for evaluating or making judgments about behavior or outcomes. “Normative” is sometimes also used, somewhat confusingly, to mean relating to a descriptive standard: doing what is normally done or what most others are expected to do in practice. In this sense a norm is not evaluative, a basis for judging behavior or outcomes; it is simply a fact or observation about behavior or outcomes, without judgment. Many researchers in science, law, and philosophy try to restrict the use of the term “normative” to the evaluative sense and refer to the description of behavior and outcomes as positive, descriptive, predictive, or empirical.

Normative has specialised meanings in different academic disciplines such as philosophy, social sciences, and law. In most contexts, normative means 'relating to an evaluation or value judgment.' Normative propositions tend to evaluate some object or some course of action. Normative content differs from descriptive content.

Though philosophers disagree about how normativity should be understood, it has become increasingly common to understand normative claims as claims about reasons. As Derek Parfit explains:

Philosophy 

In philosophy, normative theory aims to make moral judgements on events, focusing on preserving something they deem as morally good, or preventing a change for the worse. The theory has its origins in Greece. Normative statements make claims about how institutions should or ought to be designed, how to value them, which things are good or bad, and which actions are right or wrong. Normative claims are usually contrasted with positive (i.e. descriptive, explanatory, or constative) claims when describing types of theories, beliefs, or propositions. Positive statements are (purportedly) factual, empirical statements that attempt to describe reality.

For example, "children should eat vegetables", and "those who would sacrifice liberty for security deserve neither" are normative claims. On the other hand, "vegetables contain a relatively high proportion of vitamins", and "a common consequence of sacrificing liberty for security is a loss of both" are positive claims. Whether a statement is normative is logically independent of whether it is verified, verifiable, or popularly held.

There are several schools of thought regarding the status of normative statements and whether they can be rationally discussed or defended. Among these schools are the tradition of practical reason extending from Aristotle through Kant to Habermas, which asserts that they can, and the tradition of emotivism, which maintains that they are merely expressions of emotions and have no cognitive content.

There is large debate in philosophy surrounding the normative and whether you can get a normative statement from an empirical one (i.e. whether you can get an 'ought' from an 'is', or a 'value' from a 'fact'). Aristotle is one scholar who believed that you could in fact get an ought from an is. He believed that the universe was teleological and that everything in it has a purpose. To explain why something is a certain way, Aristotle believed you could simply say that it is trying to be what it ought to be. On the contrary, David Hume believed you cannot get an ought from an is because no matter how much you think something ought to be a certain way it will not change the way it is. Despite this, Hume used empirical experimental methods whilst looking at the normative. Similar to this was Kames, who also used the study of facts and objective to discover a correct system of morals.  The assumption that 'is' can lead to 'ought' is an important component of the philosophy of Roy Bhaskar.

Normative statements and norms, as well as their meanings, are an integral part of human life. They are fundamental for prioritizing goals and organizing and planning. Thought, belief, emotion, and action are the basis of much ethical and political discourse; indeed, normativity is arguably the key feature distinguishing ethical and political discourse from other discourses (such as natural science).

Much modern moral/ethical philosophy takes as its starting point the apparent variance between peoples and cultures regarding the ways they define what is considered to be appropriate/desirable/praiseworthy/valuable/good etc. (In other words, variance in how individuals, groups and societies define what is in accordance with their normative standards.) This has led philosophers such as A.J. Ayer and J.L. Mackie (for different reasons and in different ways) to cast doubt on the meaningfulness of normative statements. However, other philosophers, such as Christine Korsgaard, have argued for a source of normative value which is independent of individuals' subjective morality and which consequently attains (a lesser or greater degree of) objectivity.

Social sciences 
In the social sciences, the term "normative" has broadly the same meaning as its usage in philosophy, but may also relate, in a sociological context, to the role of cultural 'norms'; the shared values or institutions that structural functionalists regard as constitutive of the social structure and social cohesion. These values and units of socialization thus act to encourage or enforce social activity and outcomes that ought to (with respect to the norms implicit in those structures) occur, while discouraging or preventing social activity that ought not occur. That is, they promote social activity that is socially valued (see philosophy above). While there are always anomalies in social activity (typically described as "crime" or anti-social behaviour, see also normality (behavior)) the normative effects of popularly endorsed beliefs (such as "family values" or "common sense") push most social activity towards a generally homogeneous set. From such reasoning, however, functionalism shares an affinity with ideological conservatism.

Normative economics deals with questions of what sort of economic policies should be pursued, in order to achieve desired (that is, valued) economic outcomes.

Politics 
The use of normativity and normative theory in the study of politics has been questioned, particularly since the rise in popularity of logical positivism. It has been suggested by some that normative theory is not appropriate to be used in the study of politics, because of its value based nature, and a positive, value neutral approach should be taken instead, applying theory to what is, not to what ought to be. Others have argued, however, that to abandon the use of normative theory in politics is misguided, if not pointless, as not only is normative theory more than a projection of a theorist's views and values, but also this theory provides important contributions to political debate. Pietrzyk-Reeves discussed the idea that political science can never truly be value free, and so to not use normative theory is not entirely helpful. Furthermore, perhaps the normative dimension political study has is what separates it from many branches of social sciences.

International relations 
In the academic discipline of International relations, Smith, Baylis & Owens in the Introduction to their 2008  book make the case that the normative position or normative theory is to make the world a better place and that this theoretical worldview aims to do so by being aware of implicit assumptions and explicit assumptions that constitute a non-normative position, and align or position the normative towards the loci of other key socio-political theories such as political liberalism, Marxism, political constructivism, political realism, political idealism and political globalization.

Law 

In law, as an academic discipline, the term "normative" is used to describe the way something ought to be done according to a value position. As such, normative arguments can be conflicting, insofar as different values can be inconsistent with one another. For example, from one normative value position the purpose of the criminal process may be to repress crime. From another value position, the purpose of the criminal justice system could be to protect individuals from the moral harm of wrongful conviction.

Standards documents 

Normative elements are defined in International Organization for Standardization Directives Part 2 as "elements that describe the scope of the document, and which set out provisions". Provisions include "requirements", "recommendations" and "statements". "Statements" include permissions, possibilities and capabilities. A "requirement" is an "expression in the content of a document conveying criteria to be fulfilled if compliance with the document is to be claimed and from which no deviation is permitted." It is not necessary to comply with recommendations and statements in order to comply with the standard; it is necessary to comply only with the requirements (that are denoted by the verbal form "shall"). There is much confusion between "normative" and "requirement", however the ISO terminology is supported by national standards bodies worldwide and is the legitimate description of these terms in the context of standards documents.

In standards terminology still used by some organizations, "normative" means "considered to be a prescriptive part of the standard". It characterises that part of the standard which describes what ought (see philosophy above) to be done within the application of that standard. It is implicit that application of that standard will result in a valuable outcome (ibid.). For example, many standards have an introduction, preface, or summary that is considered non-normative, as well as a main body that is considered normative. "Compliance" is defined as "complies with the normative sections of the standard"; an object that complies with the normative sections but not the non-normative sections of a standard is still considered to be in compliance.

 Normative = prescriptive = how to comply
 Informative = descriptive = help with conceptual understanding

Typically, normative is contrasted with informative (referring to the standard's descriptive, explanatory or positive content). Informative data is supplemental information such as additional guidance, supplemental recommendations, tutorials, commentary as well as background, history, development, and relationship with other elements. Informative data is not a requirement and doesn't compel compliance.

See also 

 Conformity
 Decision theory
 Economics
 Hypothesis
 Is-ought problem
 Linguistic prescription
 Norm (philosophy)
 Normative economics
 Normative ethics
 Normative science
 Philosophy of law
 Political science
 Scientific method
 Value

References

Further reading 
 Canguilhem, Georges, The Normal and the Pathological, .
 Andreas Dorschel, 'Is there any normative claim internal to stating facts?', in: Communication & Cognition XXI (1988), no. 1, pp. 5–16.

Concepts in ethics
Social sciences
Philosophy of law